Benjamin Stanley "Benji" Michel (born October 23, 1997) is an American professional soccer player who plays as a winger for Primeira Liga club Arouca.

Having played college soccer for the Portland Pilots, he was signed to a homegrown contract by Orlando City SC of Major League Soccer ahead of the 2019 season.

Club career

Youth and college 
Michel grew up in Orlando, Florida and played for the Orlando City U-18s, where he scored 25 goals for the U.S. Development Academy. While at Montverde, Michel helped the team build on a record 136-game unbeaten streak, which started in 2010.

He played college soccer at the University of Portland from 2016 to 2018, scoring 31 goals in 53 matches. In his freshman year, Michel was named West Coast Conference (WCC) Freshman of the Year. In 2018, he was named to the USC All-American Second Team and was the first Pilot since 2002 to be named an All-American by the United Soccer Coaches.

In May 2018, Michel featured twice for Portland Timbers U23s during their U.S. Open Cup campaign.

Orlando City 
On December 31, 2018, Orlando City announced the signing of Michel to a Homegrown contract. He became the club's fifth homegrown player and the first to be born in Orlando and come up through the Development Academy. He made his professional debut as a substitute on March 31, 2019 in a 2–1 defeat to D.C. United. On June 19, Michel scored his first professional goal in extra-time of Orlando's 2–1 U.S. Open Cup win over New England Revolution. He scored his first MLS goal on July 13, 2019, in a 1–0 victory over Columbus Crew SC. In July 2019, Michel was selected to take part in the MLS Homegrown Game. He left Orlando upon the expiration of his contract at the end of the 2022 season.

Arouca 
On January 6, 2023, Michel officially joined Portuguese side Arouca, signing a contract until June 2025. On January 15, 2023, Michel made his debut in a 1–1 draw against Chaves, entering the match at the 68th minute. Five days later, Michel scored his first goal in a 4–0 win over Portimonense.

International career 
Although born in Orlando, Florida, Michel is also eligible to play for Haiti through his Haitian parentage.

On March 12, 2019, Michel received his first call up to the Haitian national team for their final CONCACAF Nations League qualifying match against Cuba. However, he declined the call up. On May 20, 2019, Michel was added to Haiti's preliminary 2019 Gold Cup roster.

In June 2019, Michel was called into the United States under-23 Summer Training Camp by Jason Kreis. In January 2021, Michel was called up to the senior United States national team for the first time for a friendly against Trinidad and Tobago but was an unused substitute. Michel was named to the final 20-player United States under-23 roster for the 2020 CONCACAF Men's Olympic Qualifying Championship in March 2021.

Career statistics

College

Club 
As of February 13, 2023

Honors
Orlando City
U.S. Open Cup: 2022

References

External links
 
 

1997 births
Living people
Association football forwards
Orlando City SC players
F.C. Arouca players
Portland Pilots men's soccer players
Soccer players from Orlando, Florida
American soccer players
American sportspeople of Haitian descent
Major League Soccer players
Montverde Academy alumni
Homegrown Players (MLS)
United States men's under-23 international soccer players